Manuel Díaz Gil (29 March 1929 – 28 March 1966), commonly known as Liz, was a Spanish footballer who played as a forward.

Club career
Born in Seville, Andalusia, Liz played six seasons in La Liga, five with Sevilla FC and one with Deportivo de La Coruña. He made his debut in the competition with the latter on 21 September 1952 in a 2–6 away loss against RCD Español, and scored his first goal on 23 November of the same year, but in a 1–2 home defeat to Racing de Santander; on 22 February 1953, against precisely Deportivo, he netted a hat-trick in a 6–2 home rout, going on to add a further two during the campaign to help his team rank in fifth position.

Liz suffered relegation with Deportivo in 1957, but scored against former club Sevilla in a 3–1 home success. He retired professionally in 1960, with AD Almería from Segunda División.

Personal life
Manuel's younger brother, Antonio, was also a footballer and a forward. He too represented Sevilla.

References

External links

1929 births
1966 deaths
Footballers from Seville
Spanish footballers
Association football forwards
La Liga players
Segunda División players
Sevilla FC players
Deportivo de La Coruña players